Nikyta Witkowski (born  in London, England) is a rugby centre for the Canadian national rugby team and for Coventry R.F.C. in England. He grew up in Montreal and played his rugby for the Montreal Wanderers RFC. He currently resides in Vancouver.

He has been capped 33 times for Canada.

References

External links 
Scrum.Com
Bio at Coventry Rugby

1976 births
Living people
Canada international rugby union players
Canadian rugby union players
English rugby union players
Rugby union players from London
Sportspeople from Montreal
Rugby union centres